Jeffrey Hosking (born 21 June 1953) is a South African cricketer. He played in one List A and eleven first-class matches for Border from 1980/81 to 1984/85.

See also
 List of Border representative cricketers

References

External links
 

1953 births
Living people
South African cricketers
Border cricketers
Cricketers from Johannesburg